Regenesys Business School is a private business schools based in Johannesburg, South Africa. The Regenesys Group includes Regenesys School of Public Management, Regenesys Foundation, MyWealth Investments, a loans department and having campuses in South Africa, Mumbai and Lagos. Regenesys India is also the first business school in India to give financial aid to students.

Academic programmes 
Regenesys Business School has a focus on business management and public management and its accredited programmes include
 Master of Business Administration 
 Master of Public Administration 
 Postgraduate Diploma in Business Management
 Postgraduate Diploma in Public Administration
 Bachelor of Business Administration
 Bachelor of Public Administration
 Bachelor of Business Administration in Retail Management
 Bachelor of Business Administration in Credit Banking
 Higher Certificate in Business Management
 Higher Certificate in Business Management in Retail Management
 Higher Certificate in Business Management in Credit Banking
 Higher Certificate in Public Management

Corporate programmes 

Regenesys Business School has a wide range of corporate programmes and includes programmes

 Executive Development Programmes
 Management Development Programmes
 Online Short Learning Programmes
 Skills Programmes
 Learnerships

Study abroad programmes 

Regenesys has a number of international students and its programmes are open to international students who are encouraged to study in South Africa.

 Higher Certificate in Business Management (HCBM)
 Bachelor of Business Administration (BBA)
 Postgraduate Diploma in Business Management (PDM)
 Master of Business Administration (MBA)

Accreditation 
Regenesys is accredited by the Council for Higher Education in South Africa. South African higher education institutions are accredited through the Council for Higher Education in South Africa  and Regenesys is accredited to offer its programmes, in accordance with the national quality standards.

Ranking 
Regenesys is ranked as one of the top 50 business schools in South Africa. The school was given a ranking from the 2017 PMR.Africa rating. Regenesys was ranked business school for the second year in a row, overall above fellow esteemed tertiary institutions. The ratings are based on respondents who rate MBA/MBL graduates and students on 19 attributes or criteria, including: application of knowledge in the workplace, emotional intelligence, entrepreneurial skills, financial management, innovation, leadership qualities and strategic management. The survey was conducted in early 2016 among human resource managers, directors and line managers from corporate companies, national, provincial and local government departments, municipalities and state-owned enterprises.

Advisory boards 
The Regenesys advisory board is a body that provides non-binding strategic advice to the management of the Regenesys group. The advisory council consists of 15 boards.

Spiritual and emotional intelligence 
Regenesys programmes are based around the concepts of spiritual intelligence (non-religious) and emotional intelligence. These topics have become increasingly important in business management programmes. A holistic approach is practiced as the founder of the university was a monk.

Free business education 
Regenesys launched an initiative to make free education possible without subsidies through using the Freemium business model.

The school has made four qualifications (Higher Certificate in Business Management (HCBM), Bachelor of Business Administration (BBA), Postgraduate Diploma in Business Management (PDBM) and Master of Business Administration (MBA), available at no charge. Students register and enroll online, download the study materials, study in their own time and take part in quizzes to test knowledge. Once these are passed, they receive a Certificate of Participation, which they can use for their portfolio.

Regenesys has also partnered with major organizations such as MTN Group. Pearson Education, India based Times of India Group, South African Department of Trade and Industry, Microsoft, Intel, Institute of Personnel Management and others to spread the free education initiative to a wide user base.

According to the school, many individuals have registered and are using the service.

References 

Business schools in South Africa
Business schools in Lagos
Business schools in Mumbai
Distance education institutions based in South Africa
Schools in Johannesburg
Universities in Gauteng
Organizations established in 1998
Educational institutions established in 1998
1998 establishments in South Africa
Colleges in South Africa